Marcus King (born March 11, 1996) is an American musician, singer, songwriter and guitarist.  He was initially known as lead singer, guitarist and founder of the The Marcus King Band.

His 2020 album El Dorado recorded under his own name received a nomination for Best Americana Album at the 63rd Annual Grammy Awards.

Early life
Marcus King was born in Greenville, South Carolina, United States. His father, Marvin King, was a well-known blues guitarist in South Carolina who also played with gospel acts, and his grandfather was also a regionally popular musician. Marcus began playing guitar at a very early age, and at age eight he started playing shows with his father. At age eleven, he played guitar on one of his father's albums. King was in his teens when he began playing out with his own band, juggling club gigs at night and school in the morning as he and his bandmates brainstormed with what they called "soul-influenced psychedelic Southern rock." Deciding to pursue a career in music, King dropped out of high school in his junior year and got his GED. King took an academic approach to music, studying his favorite guitar players, particularly The Allman Brothers Band co-founder Duane Allman, B.B. King, Albert King, Waylon Jennings and Merle Haggard. King studied jazz theory and jazz performance with Steve Watson at the Greenville Fine Arts Center. He received some notable early attention in 2014 after a video of him jamming at Norman's Guitars racked up millions of views on YouTube.

In 2019, King announced his debut solo album, El Dorado, produced by Dan Auerbach of The Black Keys at his Easy Eye Studio in Nashville. The album is a genre-bending release that was released on January 17, 2020 by Fantasy Records. On release, Associated Press declared “El Dorado already stands out as a definite high point of 2020.”

On 26 August 2022, King released his second album Young Blood, again produced by Dan Auerbach. Melinda Newman of Billboard called it "a staggeringly confident work." It debuted at number one in the Billboard Top Blues Albums Chart.

King married Briley Hussey in a lavish ceremony on Sunday, Feb. 19th, 2023 at the Schermerhorn Symphony Center in Nashville, Tennessee.

Discography

Albums
El Dorado (2020) No. 142 US Billboard 200
Young Blood (2022)

Singles

References

External links
 

1996 births
Living people
American blues singers
American blues guitarists
American rock singers
American rock guitarists
American Southern Rock musicians
Blues rock musicians
Musicians from Greenville, South Carolina